Ioannina Νational Airport  is an airport located four kilometers from the city center of Ioannina, Greece. Its full name is Ioannina Νational Airport - King Pyrrhus.

History
Ioannina airport was established in 1932.
The original 450m² terminal building was built in 1953 and then expanded to double the area in 1953 and by a further 600m² in 1993.
The airport was named "King Pyrros" in 2007.
Constructions of the new control tower and taxiway were completed in 2017.

On 11 July 2019 the new airport terminal was completed and commissioned. It includes a new departure and arrival hall and a waiting area for passengers as well as a restaurant and Duty-free area.

Airport facilities

The Runway has a length of 2.400 and a width 45 meters with three taxiways and a 43m2 apron. The firefighting capability is Category 6 (VI).
The terminal has an area of 5,290m2.

Airlines and destinations
The following airlines operate regular scheduled and charter flights at Ioannina Airport:

Traffic statistics

Oct 2021 not included
Jan-Sep 2022

See also
Transport in Greece
List of the busiest airports in Greece

References

External links
Greek Airport Guide: Ioannina Airport

Airports in Greece
Buildings and structures in Ioannina
Ioannina